Claremont, also known as Rose, is an unincorporated community located in Coahoma County, Mississippi, United States. Claremont is located on the former Yazoo and Mississippi Valley Railroad. A post office operated under the name Rose from 1904 to 1905 and under the name Claremont from 1905 to 1932.

References

Unincorporated communities in Coahoma County, Mississippi
Unincorporated communities in Mississippi